The following is a list of football stadiums in the Czech Republic, ordered by seating capacity. The minimum capacity is 1,000.

See also
List of European stadiums by capacity
List of association football stadiums by capacity

External links
Stadiums in the Czech Republic
Stadiums Pictures in the Czech Republic

 
Czech Republic
Football stadiums